Dr. Captain Sitara Begum is a Bangladeshi doctor, Army officer, and War hero. She is one of two women in Bangladesh who has received Bir Protik award. She played a magnificent role in Sector 2 during Liberation War of Bangladesh in 1971.

Early life
Begum was born in Kishoreganj in 1946. Her father, Israil Mian, was a lawyer. She graduated from the  Holy Cross College, Dhaka. She completed her MBBS from Dhaka Medical College. Her brother was Major Abu Taher Mohammad Haider.

Career

Begum was commission in the Medical Corps of the Pakistan Army in 1970 as a lieutenant. She was stationed in Comilla Cantonment. Her brother was stationed in Comila Cantonment as well. After the start of Bangladesh Liberation war, she and her parents with the aid of Mukti Bahini members moved from Kishorganj to Meghalaya. She then was appointed the commanding officer of Bangladesh Hospital, a Mukti Bahini hospital located inside India that operated during the war. She returned to Dhaka after the independence of Bangladesh. 

Begum left Bangladesh after her brother was killed in the 7 November 1976 Bangladesh coup d'état and settled in the United States.

See also
Women in the Bangladesh Army

References

1945 births
People from Kolkata
Women in war in Bangladesh
Recipients of the Bir Protik
Women in warfare post-1945
Bangladeshi women activists
Mukti Bahini personnel
Living people